Club Santos Laguna S.A. de C.V. Premier was a professional football team that played in the Mexican Football League. They were playing in the Liga Premier (Mexico's Third Division). Club Santos Laguna S.A. de C.V. Premier was affiliated with Santos Laguna who plays in the Liga MX. The games were held in the city of Torreón in the Estadio Corona practice field.

Players

Current squad

References

Liga Premier de México
Football clubs in Coahuila